Theo Walker Mitchell (born July 2, 1938) is an attorney from South Carolina who served in the South Carolina General Assembly from 1975 to 1995.

Early life
Theo Walker Mitchell was born to Clyde D. Mitchell and Dothenia E. Mitchell on July 2, 1938 in Greenville, South Carolina. He grew up in a broken household and his father moved to Newark, New Jersey to escape the segregationist practices of the South. Upon completion of high school, Mitchell majored in biology at Fisk University in Nashville, Tennessee and he aspired to be a doctor. After obtaining his undergraduate degree, Mitchell worked on cancer research in Washington, D.C., but while there he enrolled in law school at Howard University. Mitchell returned to South Carolina in 1969 to attend his grandmother's funeral and found a changed atmosphere that provided economic opportunities for blacks.

Political career
Choosing to remain in South Carolina, Mitchell practiced law for the Legal Services Agency of Greenville, Inc. He ran for a seat in the South Carolina House of Representatives in 1972, but lost the race. However, two years later in 1974, Mitchell won the seat for District 23. In 1982, Mitchell was indicted on a charge of illegal possession of food stamps when a client of his allegedly gave him food stamps as payment for legal services. A mistrial was declared and the charges were dropped after the jury could not reach a verdict in the case. Mitchell won election to the South Carolina Senate for District 7 in 1984 and served as a chairman of the Senate Corrections and Penology Committee during his tenure.

In 1994 Mitchell was found guilty of seven counts of violating federal tax laws and sentenced to 90 days in jail.  Because he was convicted, the South Carolina Senate voted in 1995 to expel Mitchell from the Senate by a vote of 38 to 7. It was the only time that a black member had been expelled from the state Senate. Additionally in response to his expulsion, the state Senate proposed a bill that if a member of the legislature resigns or is expelled, they must repay any compensation received. Upon the completion of his 90-day sentence, he lost the special election to fill his vacant seat.

Subsequent career
Mitchell established the law firm Theo W. Mitchell and Associates in Greenville to specialize in civil rights, human rights and criminal law. As an attorney, he undertook numerous projects for the poor and needy, the consumers, and senior citizens of the county. Mitchell also serves on the board of directors of the LaRouche Movement's Schiller Institute.

Personal life
Mitchell married Greta Knight of Pueblo, Colorado and they had three daughters. They are both Life Members of the NAACP and active members of Allen Temple A.M.E. Church in Greenville.  Member of Omega Psi Phi fraternity.

References

External links
Mitchell reprimanded by state Supreme Court, a June 6, 2005 Greenville News article
Resolution of the General Assembly honoring Theo Mitchell

1938 births
African-American state legislators in South Carolina
Fisk University alumni
Howard University alumni
LaRouche movement
Living people
Members of the South Carolina House of Representatives
People expelled from United States state legislatures
Politicians from Greenville, South Carolina
South Carolina lawyers
South Carolina state senators
21st-century African-American people
20th-century African-American people